Ryan James Ferns (born December 2, 1982) is an American politician from the state of West Virginia. He was a member of the West Virginia Senate for the 1st district. Ferns was defeated for reelection in 2018 by Democratic candidate William J. Ihlenfeld II.

Biography
Ferns was first elected to the West Virginia House of Delegates in 2010, as a member of the Democratic Party. 

On April 20, 2012, he was arrested for drunken driving in Wheeling, Virginia. On April 23, 2012, he entered a guilty plea and paid a $500 fine. Ferns' blood-alcohol level was 0.22, nearly three times West Virginia's legal limit.  That year, he was reelected by 280 votes.  He switched his allegiance to the Republican Party in November 2013.

In 2014, he challenged Democrat Rocky Fitzsimmons in an election to the West Virginia Senate. Ferns narrowly defeated Fitzsimmons. He was chosen as the West Virginia Senate Majority Leader in December 2016.

In 2018, Ferns was defeated for reelection by former U.S. Attorney for the Northern District of West Virginia William J. Ihlenfeld II.

Electoral history

See also
 List of American politicians who switched parties in office

References

External links
West Virginia Legislature - Senator Ryan Ferns official government website
Project Vote Smart - Senator Ryan Ferns (WV) profile

1982 births
21st-century American politicians
American physiotherapists
Living people
Members of the West Virginia House of Delegates
Politicians from Wheeling, West Virginia
West Virginia Democrats
West Virginia Republicans
West Virginia state senators
Wheeling University alumni